Shut Up! Cartoons was an adult animation channel project created by the Smosh duo (Anthony Padilla, Ian Hecox) and Barry Blumberg that features various animated videos.  Shut Up! Cartoons launched on April 30, 2012, with Do's and Don'ts and ended with the termination of the series Smosh Babies on June 23, 2017.

Content
The initial teaser trailer featured clips from 11 different shows, with Padilla and Hecox later informing their viewers that there were 18 planned shows in total. The first three cartoons launched by the network included Do's and Don'ts: A Children's Guide to Social Survival, Zombies vs. Ninjas, and Pubertina, a show about an 11-year-old girl going through puberty. In May 2012, Smosh launched Krogzilla, a show created by and starring Cory Edwards and featuring John O'Hurley. Snowjacked soon followed, broadcasting on Tuesdays, meeting mixed reception. 
At the end of the first three cartoons' 10-episode run, they were replaced by Nature Break, Weasel Town, and  Oishi High School Battle. Oishi High School Battle spawned a second season. Another show was added replacing Krogzilla called Samurai! Daycare. In September 2012, they also launched Politicats to replace Snowjacked. The show that replaced Nature Break is Planets, a reality show about the ten celestial bodies of the Solar System (the eight planets, Pluto, and the Sun).

Weasel Town'''s replacement, entitled Really Freaking Embarrassing, created by Peter Hannan (Nickelodeon's CatDog) had its first trailer removed from the website, stated as "shocking and disturbing content".

A new trailer was added, with fewer disturbing scenes. In September 2012, the channel launched Oishi Origins, a three-episode prequel to Oishi High School Battle. The show replacing Samurai! Daycare is Icons of Teen, which features both fictional characters (such as Batman and Spock) and real celebrities (such as Oprah Winfrey) as teenagers. Also that week, Oishi Origins was replaced by Teleporting Fat Guy, which is based on a character from previous Smosh videos and explains how he became the Teleporting Fat Guy.

On November 20, 2012, Politicats was replaced by Sub: 3 following a Speed Racer-like character that delivers pizza on a tight time limit, met by mixed reviews. On November 28, the trailer was released for With Zombies created by Matt Clark (the creator of Planets). On November 15, 2013, Do's and Don'ts and Krogzilla received IAWTV nominations for Best Animated Web Series. The second seasons for Do's and Don'ts and Pubertina premièred in April 2014, with Do's and Don'ts ending in April, and Pubertina ending in May.

On June 12, 2013, the paper series Paper Cuts premiered on the channel. The ten episodes featured shot-by-shot re-creations of famous movie scenes and trailers made entirely out of construction paper.

On June 23, 2013, the Canadian stop motion series Life's a Zoo premiered on the channel.

On June 23, 2017, the channel posted their final video, which was the series finale of Smosh Babies and ceased operations following Anthony’s departure from Smosh.

Series

Legacy
Several creators who worked with Shut Up! Cartoons have gone on to create their own series or worked on other successful shows, including Mike Hollingsworth (creator of Nature Break, who went on to become the supervising director for BoJack Horseman and serves as an executive producer for Inside Job), Brian Wysol (creator of Icons of Teen, Munroe, Maganzo and Staff of Gelroth, who went on to create Hot Streets), Emily Brundige (creator of Pubertina, who went on to develop Harvey Street Kids and serves as a writer in various animated shows like Unikitty! and Amphibia) and Daniel Dominguez (co-creator of Oishi High School Battle, who went on to work as a writer for various shows like The Epic Tales of Captain Underpants).

Notes
a.Originally created by Cuppa Coffee Studios in 2008 for Teletoon in Canada. Shut Up! Cartoons obtained the rights to the series, but has been deleted from the YouTube channel.b.Originally created by Harriss and Matt in 2008 and published to Super Deluxe. Shut Up! Cartoons gained the rights to the series following the revival of Super Deluxe in 2015.''

References

YouTube-funded channels
YouTube original programming
Companies established in 2012
Companies disestablished in 2017
YouTube channels launched in 2012
YouTube channels closed in 2017